The Australian Constitutions Act 1850, or the Australian Colonies Government Act, was an Act of the Parliament of the United Kingdom which was enacted to formally established the Colony of Victoria by separating the District of Port Phillip from the Colony of New South Wales. The Act provided an initial constitution for Victoria, which included a bicameral parliament and a Lieutenant-Governor as its vice-regal representative. It also altered the constitution of the Colony of New South Wales, and provided for similar constitutions to be set up in Van Diemen's Land (Tasmania) and South Australia. 

It was signed by Queen Victoria on 5 August 1850 and came into effect on 1 July 1851.

Background 
The Act was a response to the demands of the Port Phillip and Moreton Bay settlers, who felt inadequately represented in the New South Wales Legislative Council and who resented their taxes being channelled to New South Wales.

The Act 
The Act named the colony and set out its provisional constitution, which included the proviso of a bicameral parliament. It created the Parliament of Victoria, which initially consisted of the Victorian Legislative Council of 20 elected members and 10 members appointed by the Lieutenant Governor. This body was given jurisdiction over all but Australian lands and could pass any legislation not in conflict with the extant English laws. The Act provided that the current arrangements would continue either until a charter of justice were issued, or until legislation was passed by the Victorian Legislative Council. Earl Grey, the British Secretary of State for War from 1846 to 1852, helped the passage of the Bill through Parliament, as he wished to promote free trade and federal system of government in the colonies.

The Act also provided for similar constitutions to be applied to Van Diemen's Land and South Australia, enabling the creation of new Australian colonies with a similar form of government to New South Wales, whose constitution it also altered. It changed the qualifications for franchise  for the New South Wales Legislative Council, and enabled this body, together with the Governor of New South Wales, to establish a bicameral parliament.

The Act, thus, had significant impact on the four colonies that were already established. The Colony of Western Australia had just started receiving convicts, making it the last remaining penal colony, and the Act included special provisions which limited the rights of its citizens to participate in government.

References

Citations

Notes 

Acts of the Parliament of the United Kingdom concerning Australia
Government of Australia
1851 in Australia